Joanne Lynn Bernard (born October 4, 1963) is a Canadian politician, who was elected to the Nova Scotia House of Assembly in the 2013 provincial election. As a member of the Nova Scotia Liberal Party, she represented the electoral district of Dartmouth North until her defeat in the 2017 election.

Early life and education
Bernard grew up in Halifax and graduated from Mount Saint Vincent University in 1996 with a Bachelor of Arts degree. She then earned a Master's degree in political science from Acadia University. She also received a Certificate of Leadership from Saint Mary's University.

Political career
On October 22, 2013 Bernard was appointed to the Executive Council of Nova Scotia, where she served as Minister of Community Services as well as Minister responsible for the Disabled Persons Commission Act and Minister Responsible for the Status of Women

Personal life
Bernard is an out lesbian, she was the first openly LGBT person elected to the provincial legislature in Nova Scotia.

Electoral record

|Liberal
|Joanne Bernard
|align="right"|2,953
|align="right"|44.06
|align="right"|
|-

|New Democratic Party
|Steve Estey
|align="right"|2,020
|align="right"|30.14
|align="right"|
|-

|Progressive Conservative
|Séan G. Brownlow
|align="right"|1,729
|align="right"|25.08
|align="right"|
|}

References

Living people
Nova Scotia Liberal Party MLAs
People from Dartmouth, Nova Scotia
Women MLAs in Nova Scotia
Members of the Executive Council of Nova Scotia
Lesbian politicians
Canadian LGBT people in provincial and territorial legislatures
21st-century Canadian politicians
21st-century Canadian women politicians
Women government ministers of Canada
Mount Saint Vincent University alumni
Acadia University alumni
1963 births
21st-century Canadian LGBT people